Engelo Rumora is a real estate executive, investor, and former association football player. He is the CEO and founder of a real estate investment company called Ohio Cashflow located in Toledo, Ohio, US. Rumora is a member of the Forbes Real Estate Council.

Early life 
Engelo Rumora spent most of his childhood in his home country, Australia. He picked up playing soccer at a very young age and wanted to be a professional soccer player. He dropped out of high school at the age of 14 to focus on this sport. In 2005, at the age of 18, Engelo did become a professional soccer player but didn't quite achieve the level of success he had wanted.

Career

Since Engelo had not finished his formal education, he started working on construction sites as a laborer. As said by Engelo Rumora himself, everything changed when a friend gifted him the book “Rich Dad Poor Dad” by Robert Kiyosaki. Engelo then started attending a lot of personal development conferences and lectures on business, finance, real estate and investment. During one of these seminars, he met a real estate investor who mentored him and helped him in his initial journey of property investments.

In 2009, Engelo started working for him as an apprentice for a couple of years before moving on. His knowledge into investment coupled with construction knowledge led him to buy his first property in Victoria, Australia in 2012. Within the next six months, he bought seven more properties. After this, Engelo decided to move to the U.S.

After moving to the US, Engelo founded the turnkey real estate investment company, Ohio Cashflow. Ohio Cashflow specializes in providing turnkey properties in the Toledo, Dayton, Cincinnati and Columbus, Ohio markets.

In 2014 Rumora named 30under30 by Anthill Magazine. In 2018, Rumora featured in TLC episode “This Is Life Live". In 2018 and 2019, Ohio Cashflow named to Inc. magazine’s list of the 5,000 fastest-growing private companies in America.

Oz Realty
Engelo is also the co-founder of a property management company in Toledo, Ohio called Oz Realty.

References 

Australian real estate businesspeople
Living people
Year of birth missing (living people)